The 33rd parallel north is a circle of latitude that is 33 degrees north of the Earth's equatorial plane. It is approximate at the midpoint between the equator (0 degrees) and the Arctic Circle (66.6 degrees North Latitude.) It crosses North Africa, Asia, the Pacific Ocean, North America and the Atlantic Ocean.

In Iraq, the parallel defined the limit of the southern no-fly zone from 4 September 1996 to 30 August 2003. (Before this time, it had been set at the 32nd parallel north) as part of Operation Southern Watch.

In the United States, it approximately forms the border between Arkansas in the north and Louisiana on the south. (The border is actually a couple of kilometres north of the parallel.) The Louisiana Territory was that part of the 1803 Louisiana Purchase which lay north of the 33rd parallel.

The parallel is part of the horse latitudes.

At this latitude the sun is visible for 14 hours, 20 minutes during the summer solstice and 9 hours, 58 minutes during the winter solstice.

Around the world
Starting at the prime meridian and heading eastwards, the parallel 33° north passes through:

{| class="wikitable plainrowheaders"
! scope="col" width="125" | Co-ordinates
! scope="col" | Country, territory or sea
! scope="col" | Notes
|-
| 
! scope="row" | 
|
|-
| 
! scope="row" | 
|
|-
| 
! scope="row" | 
|
|-
| style="background:#b0e0e6;" | 
! scope="row" style="background:#b0e0e6;" | Mediterranean Sea
| style="background:#b0e0e6;" | Passing just north of Tripoli, 
|-
| 
! scope="row" | 
| Passing through Nahariya and Amuka
|-valign="top"
| 
! scope="row" | Golan Heights
|-
|
! scope="row"| UNDOF buffer zone
| About 
|-
| 
! scope="row" | 
|
|-
| 
! scope="row" | 
|
|-
| 
! scope="row" | 
|Passing just south of Baghdad
|-
| 
! scope="row" | 
|
|-
| 
! scope="row" | 
|
|-valign="top"
| 
! scope="row" | 
|Khyber Pakhtunkhwa
Punjab Azad Kashmir – claimed by 
|-valign="top"
| 
! scope="row" | 
|Jammu and Kashmir – claimed by  Ladakh – claimed by  Himachal Pradesh
|-
| 
! scope="row" | Aksai Chin 
|-valign="top"
| 
! scope="row" | 
| Tibet Qinghai Sichuan Qinghai Sichuan Gansu Shaanxi Hubei Henan Anhui Jiangsu Anhui (for about ) Jiangsu
|-
| style="background:#b0e0e6;" | 
! scope="row" style="background:#b0e0e6;" | Korea South Sea
| style="background:#b0e0e6;" | Passing just south of the island of Marado, 
|-valign="top"
| 
! scope="row" | 
| Island of Nakadōri:— Nagasaki Prefecture Island of Kyūshū:— Nagasaki Prefecture— Saga Prefecture— Kumamoto Prefecture— Ōita Prefecture Island of Shikoku:— Ehime Prefecture— Kōchi Prefecture
|-
| style="background:#b0e0e6;" | 
! scope="row" style="background:#b0e0e6;" | Pacific Ocean
| style="background:#b0e0e6;" |
|-
| 
! scope="row" | 
| California – Northern tip of San Clemente Island
|-
| style="background:#b0e0e6;" | 
! scope="row" style="background:#b0e0e6;" | Pacific Ocean
| style="background:#b0e0e6;" |
|-valign="top"
| 
! scope="row" | 
| California – passing through Solana Beach and just north of Brawley Arizona – passing through Casa Grande Ruins National Monument New Mexico Texas – passing through the Dallas–Fort Worth metroplex Louisiana – passing just south of the border with Arkansas Mississippi Alabama Georgia – passing through LaGrange, and Louisville South Carolina – passing through Goose Creek
|-
| style="background:#b0e0e6;" | 
! scope="row" style="background:#b0e0e6;" | Atlantic Ocean
| style="background:#b0e0e6;" |
|-
| 
! scope="row" | 
| Cal Islet, just south of Porto Santo Island, Madeira
|-
| style="background:#b0e0e6;" | 
! scope="row" style="background:#b0e0e6;" | Atlantic Ocean
| style="background:#b0e0e6;" |
|-
| 
! scope="row" | 
| Passing through Settat
|-
| 
! scope="row" | 
|
|}

See also
70th parallel north
32nd parallel north
34th parallel north

References

n33
Borders of Arkansas
Borders of Louisiana